"Llorando se fue" is a Bolivian folk song recorded by Los Kjarkas in 1981 on the album Canto a la mujer de mi pueblo and released as a B-side of the "Wa ya yay" single in 1982. The song has been very popular in Latin America since the 1980s and has been covered several times. It obtained international fame with artists such as Wilkins in 1984, Argentine singer Juan Ramón in 1985, Brazilian singer Márcia Ferreira in 1986 and the French-Brazilian pop group Kaoma in 1989. Kaoma's cover  "Lambada" was an unauthorized translation of the song and based on the music of Cuarteto Continental group and Márcia Ferreira's Portuguese version that led to a successful lawsuit against Kaoma's producers Olivier Lorsac and Jean Karakos. Recently, the song was adapted by several artists including Ivete Sangalo, Red Fox's "Pose Off", Jennifer Lopez for her 2011 single "On the Floor", Don Omar's "Taboo" and Wisin & Yandel's "Pam Pam".

The song is alternately titled "Lambada" in several cover versions. Its translated title in Portuguese is "Chorando se foi".

History
According to Gonzalo Hermosa, Los Kjarkas had based "Llorando se fue" on a small, nostalgic Andean melody. Their song in Spanish was written in a sad and slow Saya rhythm, which is a type of Afro-Bolivian music.

The original recording featured an A motif of 3 bars and a B motif of 4 bars, shown here transposed to the key of A minor:

The irregular 3-bar length of the A motif is a distinctive feature that was retained in "Lambada", though some other versions have padded the motif to a more conventional 4 bars. "On the Floor" takes such an approach, and omits the B motif entirely.

By 1990, Los Kjarkas authorized the translation of the song to 42 languages. They also performed a Spanish-Japanese bilingual version of the song (keeping the Saya rhythm) in concerts and for the music video made in 1990. The bilingual version was recorded on their 1996 album Sentimiento Andino, Volume 2 and on their 2001 compilation album 30 Años Sólo Se Vive Una Vez, Volume 1. Los Kjarkas also re-recorded "Llorando se fue" as an upbeat dance version for their 1991 album Tecno Kjarkas (Tecno Andino) and in 2010 with the Bolivian group Voltaje.

Single track listing

France 7" 45 RPM 
Label: B.M. Productions/CBS (1989)
Side 1
"Llorando se fue" (Saya) — (G. Hermosa, U. Hermosa) — 4:03
Side 2
"Tata Sabaya" (Huayno) — (U. Hermosa) — 2:28

Japan 3" (8cm) CD 
Label: Polydor (1990)
"Llorando se fue" — (G. Hermoza, U. Hermoza)
"Wa ya yay" (Huayño) — (U. Hermoza)

Márcia Ferreira version
Brazilian singer-songwriter Márcia Ferreira was inspired to cover "Llorando se fue" when she first heard the song in its original Saya by Los Kjarkas on her trip to Tabatinga, and afterwards she bought a vinyl record by the Peruvian group Cuarteto Continental, who included their cover noted for its first upbeat version of the song introducing the accordion and produced by Alberto Maraví. She co-wrote "Chorando se foi" with José Ari as the first legally authorized Portuguese version of "Llorando se fue" and adjusted the song to the Lambada dance rhythm popular in Brazil. She released "Chorando se foi" in 1986 for her self-titled third album, which has been certified platinum. With the success of her cover version and  musical career, she became known in Brazil as "A Rainha da Lambada" ("The Queen of Lambada").

Cover versions of "Chorando se foi" is credited to Márcia Ferreira and José Ari as the original authors for their Portuguese translation, in addition to the original composers Ulises Hermosa and Gonzalo Hermosa.

Kaoma version

In 1989, French band Kaoma had a chart-topping hit with their dance music single "Lambada," a cover of Brazilian singer-songwriter Márcia Ferreira's 1986 dance hit "Chorando se foi," which itself was a legally authorized Portuguese-translated rendition of the original 1981 slow ballad, "Llorando se fue" by the Bolivian group Los Kjarkas. Given Kaoma's release of their single without Los Kjarkas' permission, Los Kjarkas successfully sued. Kaoma's "Lambada" was originally credited to a fictitious composer with the pseudonym Chico de Oliveira, and the publishing rights of this composer were registered at the French Société des auteurs, compositeurs et éditeurs de musique. In 1991, a French court ruled that Kaoma's song was a copyright violation and that the correct original authors should appear on all future releases.

Other versions
In 1984, an upbeat version of the song introducing the accordion was released by the Peruvian group Cuarteto Continental, whose arrangements (produced by Alberto Maravi) were later purchased by Kaoma. The first Portuguese translation and recording of "Llorando se fue" - as "Chorando se foi" - was released by Brazilian singer-songwriter Márcia Ferreira (with co-writer José Ari) in 1986 under her third album.

Prior to Kaoma's 1989 release of the song, several covers of "Llorando se fue" had been released as dance tracks:
1984 - Cuarteto Continental from the LP Fiesta de Cumbias, sung by Julio Mau Orlandini
1984 - Armonía 10 from the LP El Chinchorro, Vol. 2
1984 - Sexteto Internacional from the LP Mas Sexteto, sung by Julio Mejia
1984 - Tropical Pingüino
1984 - Wilkins from the album Una Historia Importante - 15 Grandes Exitos
1984 - Chacalón y la Nueva Crema from the EP Llorando se fue/Llorando y sufriendo
1984 - Grupo Trebol from the LP Tropical Andino
1985 - Freddy Roland from the LP Chicha Up
1985 - Juan "Corazón" Ramón from the album Cada Día Mejor
1985 - Don Medardo y sus Player from the album Lo Mejor del Año, Vol. 4
1985 - Vico y su Grupo Karicia from the LP Voz y sentimiento
1986 - Márcia Ferreira
1986 - Cuarteto Continente of Peru, sung by Nacho Valdez, produced by Nazareno Pro.
1986 - Los Graduados from the album Flor de un día
1986 - Pastor López from the album Cumbia Universal
1987 - Sonora Andacollo from the album Norte Tropical - Lambada
1987 - Terramérica from the LP Arapuê
1988 - Los Hermanos Rosario from the album Otra Vez
1988 - Ana Morena from the compilation album Baila Baila Baila, Vol. 2
1988 - Sonora Junior L. Palacios from the album Que Siga La Cumbia, Vol. 3
1988 - Tropicalismo Apache from the album Exitos Quemantes
1989 - Los Flamers from the album Gran Reventon Gran, Vol. 5
1990 - Appears on the Sun City Girls' album Torch of the Mystics as "The Shining Path"
1990 - The tune of "Sochna kya jo bhi ho ga dekha jaye ga" ("Don't overthink it, whatever happens, will be taken care of (handled)"), a Hindi song from the Indian film Ghayal was based on this song. The singers were Asha Bhonsle, Kumar Sanu and Shabbir Kumar.
1990 - Cantopop songstress Aling Choi, titled "Life Carnival" (Traditional Chinese: 人生嘉年華) from the album The Simple Life
1991 - Screechy Dan & Red Fox's "Pose Off" from Drum Song Riddim
2006 - Wisin & Yandel's "Pam Pam" from the album  Pa'l Mundo: Deluxe Edition
2009 - Bob Sinclar's "Give Me Some More" featuring DJ Roland Clark, from the album Born in 69
2011 - Don Omar's "Taboo" from the album Meet the Orphans
2011 - Jennifer Lopez's "On the Floor" from the album Love? incorporates quite a few elements
2011 - Anahí's "Chorando se Foi" for the tour Mi Delirio World Tour

References

External links

. Original Music Video at YouTube

Spanish-language songs
Japanese-language songs
1981 songs
Asha Bhosle songs
1982 singles